Day is an unincorporated community in Modoc County, California.

A post office operated at Day from 1888 to 1925 and from 1926 to 1953.

The lightining-sparked Day Fire in 2014 started just north of the community, ultimately destroying 6 structures and injuring 7 people.

References

Unincorporated communities in California
Unincorporated communities in Modoc County, California